This is an organized list of all of the active aircraft squadrons that currently exist in the United States Air Force, sorted by type.  Most squadrons have changed names and designations many times over the years, so they are listed by their current designation. Expeditionary and provisional units are not listed.

To see all USAF squadrons, regardless of active or not, as well as non-flying squadrons, go to the List of United States Air Force squadrons.

Aerial Targets Squadrons

Aggressor Squadrons

Air Demonstration Squadrons

Air Refueling Squadrons

Airborne Air Control Squadrons

Airborne Command and Control Squadrons

Airlift Squadrons

Attack Squadrons

Bomb Squadrons

Electronic Combat Squadrons

Fighter Squadrons

Fighter Training Squadrons

Flight Test Squadrons

Flying Training Squadrons

Helicopter Squadrons

Reconnaissance Squadrons

Rescue Squadrons

Special Operations Squadrons

Test and Evaluation Squadrons

Weapons Squadrons

Weather Reconnaissance Squadrons

See also
 United States Air Force
 List of United States Air Force squadrons

References
Footnotes

Citations

Aircraft, active
 
United States Air Force aircraft squadrons